Elizabeth Ann Copeland (born June 1, 1964) is an American lawyer who serves as a judge of the United States Tax Court.

Biography 

Copeland was born on June 1, 1964, in Colorado Springs, Colorado. She received a Bachelor of Business Administration degree, cum laude, in 1986 from the University of Texas at Austin. Prior to attending law school, she worked at Ernst & Whinney (now Ernst & Young) from 1986 to 1989. Copeland received a Juris Doctor in 1992 from the University of Texas School of Law. While attending law school, she served as a law clerk to Justice Eugene A. Cook of the Supreme Court of Texas. She began her legal career as an attorney adviser to Judge Mary Ann Cohen of the United States Tax Court, from 1992 to 1993. From 1993 to 2012, she practiced law with the firm of Oppenheimer, Blend, Harrison & Tate, Inc., becoming a shareholder in 2000. She practiced law with the firm of Strasburger & Price, LLP, in San Antonio, Texas, from 2012 to 2018, when she became a judge. She handled all matters pertaining to federal income taxation, including planning and tax controversies, and also dealt with the Internal Revenue Service at the administrative appeals level and in litigation.

Recognition and certifications 

Copeland has been board certified in tax law by the Texas Board of Legal Specialization since 2002. Tax Analysts named her a 2012 Tax Person of the Year in its national edition of Tax Notes. She served as chair of the State Bar of Texas Tax Section in 2013 to 2014 and is a Certified Public Accountant.

United States Tax Court service

Expired nomination under Obama 

On May 4, 2015, President Barack Obama nominated Copeland to serve as a Judge of the United States Tax Court, to the seat vacated by Judge Diane Kroupa, who retired on June 16, 2014. She received a hearing before the United States Senate Committee on Finance on January 29, 2016. On April 18, 2016, her nomination was reported out of committee by a 26–0 vote. Her nomination expired on January 3, 2017, with the end of the 114th Congress.

Renomination to tax court under Trump 

On August 3, 2017, President Donald Trump nominated Copeland to serve as a Judge of the United States Tax Court, to the seat vacated by Judge James Halpern, who retired on October 16, 2015. The Senate Finance Committee held a hearing on her nomination on June 12, 2018 and then voted out her nomination unanimously on June 28, 2018. On August 28, 2018, her nomination was confirmed by voice vote. She took office on October 12, 2018.

References

External links 
 

1964 births
Living people
20th-century American women lawyers
20th-century American lawyers
21st-century American women lawyers
21st-century American lawyers
21st-century American judges
21st-century American women judges
Judges of the United States Tax Court
McCombs School of Business alumni
People from Colorado Springs, Colorado
Texas lawyers
United States Article I federal judges appointed by Donald Trump
University of Texas School of Law alumni